Iyari Pérez Limón (born July 8, 1976) is a Mexican-born American actress, best known for her supporting role as Potential Slayer Kennedy on the television series Buffy the Vampire Slayer.

Early life
Limón was born in Guadalajara, Jalisco, Mexico on July 8, 1976. She moved to Los Angeles, California, at the age of one, and grew up in Southern California.

Career

Limón has appeared in numerous TV commercials, both in Spanish and English. Among her credits are commercials for Toyota, Dr Pepper, and Always.

During her screen test for the part of Carmen Morales in The L Word, Limón ad libbed a Spanish phrase into Kate Moennig's ear ("Quiero lamerte hasta que te vengas en mi boca mil veces" - "I want to lick you until you come in my mouth a thousand times"); the phrase was written into the show and used in the series by Sarah Shahi's portrayal of the character.

Limón played Clovis Galletta in the 2011 video game L.A. Noire.

Personal life
Limón came out as bisexual in an interview with the website AfterEllen.com in April 2006, in which she stated that she was once married to Napoleon Dynamite actor Efren Ramirez and was, at the time of the interview, dating DJ Sandra Edge.  In September 2007, AfterEllen.com further reported that Limon and Edge had ended their relationship, and that Limon was pregnant by her boyfriend Alejandro Soltero. Limon married Alejandro Soltero and their daughter was born on August 24, 2007.

Filmography

Film

Television

Video Games

References

External links

1976 births
American film actresses
American television actresses
Mexican film actresses
Mexican television actresses
Bisexual actresses
LGBT Hispanic and Latino American people
American actresses of Mexican descent
Living people
Mexican emigrants to the United States
Actresses from Guadalajara, Jalisco
21st-century American women
American bisexual actors
Mexican LGBT actors